Joseph 'Joe' C. Perry is an American businessperson and politician from Maine. Perry, a Democrat, served in the Maine Senate from District 32, which included his hometown of Bangor and Hermon. He was first elected to the Senate in 2004 after serving from 8 years (1996-2004) in the Maine House of Representatives representing part of Bangor. He defeated incumbent Republican Senator Tom Sawyer by 280 votes. In 2015, Perry won a seat on the Bangor City Council.

In the 124th legislature (2008-2010), Perry served as Senate Chair of the Joint Standing Committee on Taxation.

In 2010, Perry sought re-election to represent District 32. However, he was defeated with 42% of the vote in a two-way race to Republican Nichi Farnham.

He attended the University of Maine at Orono from 1984 to 1988.

Perry owns Joe's Market in Bangor.

In March 2019, Perry won the special election for the Maine House's 124th District. The special election was called after incumbent Democrat Aaron Frey resigned to become Attorney General of Maine. Perry defeated Republican Thomas White to win the seat.

References

Year of birth missing (living people)
Living people
Democratic Party Maine state senators
Democratic Party members of the Maine House of Representatives
University of Maine alumni
21st-century American politicians
Bangor City Council members
Businesspeople from Maine